There are 78 species of Myriapoda native to Ireland.

Class Chilopoda (centipedes)

Order Scolopendromorpha (tropical centipedes)

Family Cryptopidae

Common Cryptops (Cryptops hortensis)
Cryptops parisi

Order Geophilomorpha (soil centipedes)

Family Geophilidae 

Geophilus carpophagus
Geophilus easoni
Geophilus electricus
Geophilus flavus
Geophilus fucorum subsp. serauti 
Geophilus insculptus
Geophilus osquidatum 
Geophilus truncorum

Family Dignathodontidae

Henia brevis

Family Schendylidae

Hydroschendyla submarina
Schendyla carniolensis

Family Himantariidae

Stigmatogaster subterraneus

Family Linotaeniidae

Strigamia acuminata
Strigamia crassipes
Strigamia maritima

Order Lithobiomorpha (stone centipedes)

Family Henicopidae

Lamyctes emarginatus

Family Lithobiidae

Lithobius borealis
Brown centipede (Lithobius forficatus)
Lithobius melanops
Lithobius muticus
Lithobius pilicornis
Common banded centipede (Lithobius variegatus)
Lithobius crassipes
Stone centipede (Lithobius microps)

Class Diplopoda (millipedes)

Order Polyxenida

Family Polyxenidae

Bristly millipede (Polyxenus lagurus)

Order Glomerida

Family Doderiidae

Adenomeris gibbosa

Family Glomeridae

Common European pill millipede (Glomeris marginata)

Order Chordeumatida

Family Anthroleucosomatidae

Irish Silk Millipede (Anamastigona pulchella)

Family Brachychaeteumatidae

Brachychaeteuma bagnalli
Brachychaeteuma melanops

Family Chordeumatidae

Chordeuma proximum
Melogona gallica
Melogona scutellaris
Nanogona polydesmoides

Family Craspedosomatidae

Craspedosoma rawlinsii

Order Julida

Family Blaniulidae

Archiboreoiulus pallidus
Spotted snake millipede (Blaniulus guttulatus)
Boreoiulus tenuis
Choneiulus palmatus
Nopoiulus kochii
Proteroiulus fuscus

Family Julidae

Brachyiulus pusillus
Cylindroiulus britannicus
Cylindroiulus caeruleocinctus
Cylindroiulus latestriatus
Cylindroiulus londinensis
Cylindroiulus parisiorum
Blunt-tailed snake millipede (Cylindroiulus punctatus)
Cylindroiulus truncorum
Cylindroiulus vulnerarius
Julus scandinavius
Leptoiulus belgicus
Striped millipede (Ommatoiulus sabulosus)
Ophyiulus pilosus
White-legged snake millipede (Tachypodoiulus niger)

Family Nemasomatidae

Nemasoma varicorne
Thalassisobates littoralis

Order Polydesmida

Family Polydesmidae

Flat millipede (Brachydesmus superus)
Flat-backed millipede (Polydesmus angustus)
Polydesmus coriaceus
Polydesmus denticulatus
Polydesmus inconstans

Family Macrosternodesmidae

Macrosternodesmus palicola
Ophiodesmus albonanus

Family Paradoxosomatidae

Greenhouse millipede (Oxidus gracilis)
Stosatea italica

References

External links
Chilopoda and Diplopoda by Rev. W. F. Johnson M.A. FRS.
"‘Hundreds’ of reasons to like millipedes"

Ireland, myriapods
Ireland
myriapods